Armenia, also known as Armenia Mantequilla (Spanish for Butter Armenia) to avoid confusion with other Armenias, is a municipality and town in the western region of the Antioquia Department, Colombia.

References
http://www.armenia-antioquia.gov.co

Municipalities of Antioquia Department